was the eldest son and heir of Prime Minister Fumimaro Konoe and the 13th generation descendant of Emperor Go-Yōzei. He served as First Lieutenant in the Imperial Japanese Army in World War II, and died in detention in the Soviet Union.

Biography 
Fumitaka Konoe was born in Kyoto as the eldest son of Fumimaro Konoe and his wife Chiyoko, (from a branch of the Mōri clan). The Konoe were members of the kazoku nobility and the lain was part of the Fujiwara northern house, the leading go-sekke (five houses) lineage.

After graduating from Gakushūin junior high school, Fumitaka Konoe was sent to the United States to study as a diplomat. He graduated from Lawrenceville School and studied at Princeton University. He actively participated as an amateur golfer during his stay in America and worked as the manager of a golf club. He returned to Japan in 1938 to become his father's executive secretary.

The following year, in 1939, he became a lecturer at Toa Doubunin University (The Tung Wen College) in Shanghai concurrently becoming became a student director (salary: ¥ 117.60 per month, overseas allowance: ¥ 54.40 per month). With the diplomatic situation in China between the Kuomintang government and the Imperial Japanese Army becoming increasing strained, Konoe felt the need for direct negotiations with Chiang Kai-shek to avoid open warfare. He cultivated an association with the daughter of an important government official who guided him to Chongqing; this private diplomacy was discovered by the Kempeitai, and he was then recalled to Japan because this was seen by the cabinet as a problem. The woman he had made an acquaintance with was a Chinese spy -  there is also a theory that he was ordered to return home for fear that he would leak confidential information to Zheng Pingru.  After his return to Japan, Konoe created a youth political organization called the Shonen Doshi-kai (青年同志会) to continue to insist on direct negotiations to prevent war in China. His actions were regarded as a problem by military authorities, in February 1940 he was drafted into the Imperial Japanese Army. Due to his family connections, he was fast track promoted to First Lieutenant and was assigned to a Manchukuo-based artillery regiment.

In the midst of the Pacific War, he was married in Harbin in 1944 to Empress Teimei's niece, Masako Otani. On August 19, 1945, four days after the official end of the war, he was arrested by a Soviet GRU Smersh unit and taken as a prisoner to the Soviet Union. He was moved through 15 different detention camps in Siberia over the next ten years. During his detention, he refused to use his rank as an officer as a shield against labor, and abuse. In 1955, during Japanese-Soviet diplomatic normalization negotiations, Prime Minister Ichirō Hatoyama made a formal request for his release, and presented a petition signed by hundreds of thousands of people from Japan; however, the Soviet Union refused. In 1956 it was reported that he had died at Ivanovo camp (Ministry of Home Affairs No. 48 Rageri)  Ivanovo Oblast, Lezhnevsky district, Cherntsy village. The cause of death is thought to be cerebral hemorrhage due to arteriosclerosis and acute nephritis, but there is also a theory he was poisoned by the Soviet secret services. His remains were returned to Japan in 1958 due to the efforts of his wife Masako.

On October 18, 1991, in accordance with Articles 2 and 3 of the Soviet Law on Restoring the Honor of Victims of Political Repression he was formally acquitted of wrongdoing, and on February 27, 1992, this ruling was reconfirmed by the Russian Federation's Military Police High Public Prosecutor, with a  certificate to this effect issued on October 16, 1997 by the Russian Federation's Military Police High Public Prosecutor.

At the time of his death, he had no legitimate child, his wife Masako adopted Fumimaro's step-grandson Moriteru Hosokawa. who then became head of the family.

Genealogy

Konoe family 
The Konoe family was one of the go-sekke (five houses) families, starting with Motozane Konoe, the son of Tadashi Fujiwara.

Relationship with the Imperial Family 

 Because there are so many relatives, only male descendants of Emperor Go-yozei are listed. Maternal genealogy is omitted.
 The ancestor Nobuhiro Konoe was born as the fourth prince of Emperor Go-yosei. Nobutada Konoe was adopted and ascended to the head of the family.

See also 
 Zheng Pingru

References 
 Masaaki Nishiki, Let's Remember Yumeko san (Bungei Shunju, 1999)

 “Let's Remember Yumeko san, The Last Noble Youth, The Life of Fumitaka Konoe” (Bunshun Library Up / Down, 2002)
 “Let's Remember Yumeko-san, The Last Noble Youth, The Life of Fumitaka Konoe” (Shueisha Library Up / Down, 2009)
 Top , Bottom 

 V. A. Arkhangeliski "Prince Konoe Murder Case", translated by Ichiro Ryuuzawa, Shinchousha, 2000. 
Miyoko Kudou, “The Seven Mysteries of the Konoe Family That Have Not Told of The Showa Era” PHP Research Institute, 2009
 Tadahiro Konoe et al. “The Konoe Family's Pacific War” NHK “Road to Pearl Harbor”, Data Collection, Japan Broadcast Publishing Association, 2004
 The nephew who will be the next head of the Konoe family is also a narrator. Broadcast on NHK Special Selection.

Model work (artistic portrayal) 

 Theatrical company Shiki (four seasons) musical "The hill of a foreign country"
 Musical drama "Mato (Capital of Devils) Nocturne"

Notes 

1915 births
1956 deaths
People from Kyoto
Princeton University alumni
Imperial Japanese Army officers
Imperial Japanese Army personnel of World War II
Members of the Kwantung Army
Konoe family
Siberian internees
Prisoners who died in Soviet detention
Japanese people who died in prison custody
Japan–Soviet Union relations